Collins Booksellers Pty Ltd is an Australian book store chain founded in 1922 by Frederick Henry Slamen. The name Collins is from the original location of the first store, 622 Collins Street, Melbourne.

The company remained family owned until 2005, when it was placed into administration resulting in a franchisee buyout of company owned stores.

In 2020 the company consists of only 24 franchised outlets under the brand name "Collins Booksellers" and 2 stores under the brand name "Hill of Content", down from the peak of 80 stores in 2011.

Notes

Bookshops of Australia
Retail companies established in 1922
Australian companies established in 1922